"Last Lunch" is the thirteenth episode of the seventh season of the American television comedy series 30 Rock, the 138th overall episode, and the second part of the one-hour series finale. It was directed by Beth McCarthy-Miller and written by Tina Fey and Tracey Wigfield. The episode originally aired as an hour-long episode, along with "Hogcock!", on NBC on January 31, 2013. Guest stars in this episode include Al Roker, Conan O'Brien, and Alice Ripley.

In the episode, Liz Lemon (Fey) returns for the final episode of TGS and is thrown into a world of chaos: Jack Donaghy (Alec Baldwin) has quit his job and appears to be on the verge of suicide, Tracy Jordan (Tracy Morgan) is attempting to stop the episode from going ahead because he is due for a payout from the network if the episode doesn't happen, and Lutz (John Lutz) is attempting to use his turn to pick lunch for the writers as an opportunity to exact revenge on them for constantly picking on him. Meanwhile, Kenneth Parcell (Jack McBrayer) attempts to extract some genuine emotion from Jenna Maroney (Jane Krakowski), as she readies her final song for the show.

Together, "Hogcock!" and "Last Lunch" received universal acclaim from critics. According to Nielsen Media Research, the episodes were watched by 4.88 million viewers during their original broadcast, becoming 30 Rock's highest-rated episodes for two years. It was nominated for four Primetime Emmy Awards: Outstanding Directing for a Comedy Series, Outstanding Writing for a Comedy Series, Outstanding Single-Camera Picture Editing for a Comedy Series, and Outstanding Original Music and Lyrics for "Rural Juror", ultimately winning one for Fey and Wigfield's writing. It has been listed as one of the greatest series finales in television history by numerous publications.

Plot
Liz Lemon (Tina Fey) returns for the final episode of TGS and is immediately faced with two problems: Tracy Jordan (Tracy Morgan), whom she expects will do anything in his power to stop production going ahead so that he will get his $30 million payout from the network, and Lutz (John Lutz), who gets to pick the last lunch the TGS writers will share together. Meanwhile, Jack Donaghy (Alec Baldwin) is preparing to leave and regrets the way things ended with Liz, but his attempts to make it up to her are rejected. Tearfully, he appeals to Jenna Maroney (Jane Krakowski) for advice on how to repair the pair's broken friendship, but she warns him that she has never known Liz to let a grudge go. Finally, network president Kenneth Parcell (Jack McBrayer) wants Jenna to pick an emotional musical number that she can perform at the close of the final show.

Both of Liz's problems escalate. Tracy bribes Al Roker to run a news report that a snowicane is headed for the city, while Lutz decides to order lunch from Blimpies, much to the annoyance of the other writers. Meanwhile, Jack begins to act more and more strangely, giving away his personal possessions and walking around the TGS studio declaring his love and appreciation for everyone. Pete (Scott Adsit) theorizes that he could be planning to commit suicide. He then suggests that a real man would opt instead to fake his own death, an idea he becomes suspiciously enamored with. Liz initially dismisses this, but grows concerned when Jack suggests he'll be at the final show "in spirit". Elsewhere, following her unsuccessful attempts to make it in dramatic television and movies, Jenna decides that she will return to her first love, Broadway. She picks the song from her upcoming musical The Rural Juror as her final performance for TGS. However, upon hearing it, Kenneth is concerned that Jenna's performance lacks real emotion and he believes she does not genuinely care that the show is ending.

In the writers' room, Lutz remains five steps ahead of everybody as they attempt to overthrow him and choose another lunch picker. He proclaims that ordering Blimpies is his revenge on them for having constantly picked on him, unprovoked, for the last seven years. Liz overpowers him and locks him in her office, but he escapes through the ceiling panels and lands right on top of their new lunch choice, finally getting his triumphant victory. The others concede to ordering from Blimpies. Kenneth returns to Jenna's dressing room with two removal men in tow and informs her that he needs to take her mirror because Brian Williams wants it for his bathroom. Suddenly, she breaks down in tears as she realizes that TGS is over for good and that she will miss something after all, even if it's just her mirror. As the final broadcast approaches, Tracy disappears and Grizz (Grizz Chapman) and Dot Com (Kevin Brown) reveal that he is hiding out at Dark Sensations, the strip club to which he had taken Liz when they'd first met. She confronts him and he explains that he is not disrupting the show because of the money, but rather due to his fear of saying goodbye to people ever since he was young, which began with his father going out for cigarettes and never returning. Liz tries to reassure him that they will remain friends, but after Tracy immediately sees through her half-hearted attempt,  Liz confesses that it is possible, if not likely, that they won't remain friends after TGS. She says this is because people naturally drift apart. Nonetheless, she tells Tracy she loves him despite everything he has put her through. Tracy appreciates her honesty and agrees to return.

At the final recording, Jenna tells Tracy that she will miss him and the pair embrace. However, Jack is suspiciously absent. Furthermore, another conversation with Pete about faking his own death leads Liz to believe that Jack is indeed planning to commit suicide. Her fears are confirmed when she discovers a video suicide note in his office. She tracks his phone to the waterfront, where he is preparing to leave on a boat (a Cheoy Lee built "Rhodes Reliant"). He explains that he plans to go away to find what makes him happy. He says he only led her to believe he wanted to kill himself because he was afraid that they'd never make up and she'd forever hold her grudge. He goes on to confess that over the last seven years, she was one thing that consistently made him happy. The pair then acknowledge that they love each other as friends. Jack departs on his boat, but turns around almost immediately and declares that he's found the answer. He believes he's come up with the best idea he's ever had: dishwashers you can see into. At TGS, Tracy thanks the audience for tuning in for the past seven years, while Jenna emotionally performs her final song.

Epilogue
One year later, Pete has faked his own death and started a new life, but is found by his wife; Liz is producing Grizz's new sitcom Grizz & Herz, and has taken her children to work; she has also stayed in touch with Tracy, whose father has finally returned from getting cigarettes; Jenna is attempting to steal a Tony Award from Alice Ripley; Jack's creation of the see-through dishwasher has led him to his lifelong dream job: CEO of GE, and he is still friends with Liz. In the distant future, an immortal Kenneth holds a snow globe containing a model of the Rockefeller Center as he listens in delight to Liz's great-granddaughter pitch for a show that will be based on the stories Liz had told her about working at TGS. Behind him, flying cars zoom past his office window.

Reception
The hour-long broadcast of "Hogcock!" and "Last Lunch" was watched by 4.88 million viewers and earned a 1.9 rating/5 share in the 18–49 demographic. This means that it was seen by 1.9 percent of all 18- to 49-year-olds and 5 percent of all 18- to 49-year-olds watching television at the time of the broadcast.  This represented a season high in total viewers and in the demographic, an increase of two million viewers over the previous season finale and the highest-rated episode of the series, in overall viewers, for two years. When data obtained from DVR viewers who watched the episode within seven days of broadcast was factored in, total viewership for the finale increased by 25 percent, to 6.13 million viewers, and viewership in the demographic increased by 37 percent, to a 2.6 rating.

The series finale received unanimous acclaim from critics and from fans of the series. Alan Sepinwall of HitFix opined that "the finale gave these ridiculous cartoon characters three dimensions for at least a few moments so they could say proper goodbyes to each other, and to us." He elaborated that "Liz and Tracy back at the strip club was a blunt but heartfelt summation of their whole relationship, and Jack on the boat giving a long preamble about the true nature of their friendship before saying that he loved Liz (which Liz spared him from actually having to do by saying it to him first) was a thing of beauty." In conclusion, he wrote that "[he would] miss this show, but this ending felt close to perfect." Roth Cornet of IGN gave the episode a "masterpiece" 10 out of 10 and commented "30 Rock had the rare ability to provide both comedy and earned sentiment. That has never been more true than in these final two episodes" and concluded that "Jack goes back to his roots, his true-love, after a gloriously short-lived soul searching sea adventure: housewares. Liz, once and for all, embraces the fact that, yes, you can have it all, but "having it all" ultimately means truly knowing and accepting yourself, and having the willingness to compromise. And with that, a series that could have been an ingenious bit of comedy, but not much more, became a show about people and relationships that will stay with us well past the final fade to black tonight."

Pilot Viruet of The A.V. Club awarded the episode an "A" and singled out two scenes in particular as "perfect": "The first is Liz meeting Tracy at the strip club they visited in the pilot and, while admitting that it’s possible they won’t be friends after this, admitting she still does sincerely love him. The second scene is, if [sic] course, Jack’s suicide fakeout, which he staged as a way to prove that Liz Lemon would miss him in the future."  Viruet concluded that "It’s a show whose impact will be seen in plenty of future sitcoms [...] and while it’s a shame to see it go, it’s great to see it go out on such a high note." Amy Amatangelo of Paste scored the episode a 9.3 out of 10 and opined that "It’s hard to create a series finale that will make every fan happy. But 30 Rock, which is going out still very close to the top of its game, came very close. There was so much to love about the episode: Liz’s frighteningly spot-on fights with the moms at Gothammoms.com. Jenna landing in LA, seeing the competition, and high-tailing it right back to New York. The show getting in a few last digs at NBC. Plenty of Grizz and Dot Com. What appeared to be the show’s real crew in the final TGS shot. The return of Jonathan. Tracy spelling out his name for Kenneth’s receptionist ("‘R’ as in the pirate noise, ‘A’ as in the Fonzie noise"). Jenna having actual feelings even when she can’t look in the mirror to confirm that she’s crying. Sure, I could have done without the Lutz demand for "Blimpies" as the last lunch, but I quibble."

James Poniewozik of Time commented that "In some ways, last week’s episode felt more like a finale, in that it put a period on several stories: Liz got her kids, TGS hit the end of its run, Jack got Kabletown and Kenneth became president of NBC. The last hour, on the other hand, was a goodbye–in a 30 Rock-ian meta sense, it was like the "one more episode" that TGS itself had to make, because we weren’t quite ready to stop" and added "And I’m glad we got that epilogue, because as neatly as the rest of this shortened final season wrapped up 30 Rock’s plotlines, this last hour captured its emotion." Tom Gliatto of People praised the episode as "one of the most delightful series wrap-ups [he could] remember" and added that "[the characters] were full of the sparkling, absurd liveliness that characterized the show at its best throughout seven seasons." He concluded that "With its endless supply of shiny, shapely little jokes, the show could feel like a wonderful salad served up without a bowl. You got tired of being showered with lovely microgreens. This time we got the bowl. It was a lovely burnished wood." Brian Lowry of Variety was slightly less favourable, commenting "The finale earns points for ambition and nostalgia. There are the obligatory celebrity cameos, some very clever lines, a nifty callback to the pilot, and a kicker that exhibits a real love for television a lot of the audience probably won't understand it. But the whole thing is a little too precious and yes, weird - frittering away too much time on the supporting players [...] before getting to the really good stuff."

Homages
Jack's speech to the crew comes almost word for word from Emily Webb's speech at the end of Our Town. The snow globe Kenneth holds in the final scene is a homage to the St. Elsewhere finale, in which it is suggested that the events of the entire series were a child's dream. In contrast, the ending of 30 Rock implies that the TV show pitched by Liz's great-granddaughter is 30 Rock itself. In a final Star Wars reference, the last of many throughout the series, the cars flying past Kenneth's window are from The Empire Strikes Back.

References

External links

30 Rock (season 7) episodes
2013 American television episodes
American television series finales
Television episodes written by Tina Fey
Television shows directed by Beth McCarthy-Miller
Emmy Award-winning episodes

pt:Hogcock!/Last Lunch